This is a gallery of current and historical flags of Polynesia.

Flags of sovereign states in Polynesia

New Zealand 
See also: List of New Zealand flags

National flags

Ensigns

Other flags

See also 

 New Zealand flag debate
 2015–2016 New Zealand flag referendums

Samoa

National flags

Other flags

Tonga

National flags

Ensigns

Royal standards

Tuvalu

National flags

Flags of dependencies and other territories in Polynesia

American Samoa 
Unincorporated territory of the United States of America

The Cook Islands 
Associated state of New Zealand

Easter Island 
Special territory of Chile

French Polynesia 
Overseas collectivity of France

Subdivisions of French Polynesia

Hawaii 
State of the United States of America

Johnston Atoll 
United States Minor Outlying Islands of the Pacific

Niue 
Associated state of New Zealand

Norfolk Island 
External territory of Australia

Pitcairn Islands 
External territory of Australia

Tokelau 
External territory of Australia

Wake Island 
United States Minor Outlying Island of the Pacific

Wallis and Futuna 
French Island Collectivity

Royal standards

References 

Lists and galleries of flags
lists of national symbols
National flags